Edwin Stafford Nelson (December 21, 1928 – August 9, 2014) was an American actor, best known for his role as Dr. Michael Rossi in the television series Peyton Place.

Nelson appeared in episodes of many TV programs, more than 50 movies, and hundreds of stage productions.

Early life
Nelson was raised in North Carolina after having been born in New Orleans, Louisiana. He was educated at Edwards Military Institute and Camp Lejeune High School, playing football and basketball at the latter school.

He began acting while attending Tulane University in New Orleans. He left college after two years to study at the New York School of Radio and Television Technique. He served with the United States Navy as a radioman on the light cruiser USS Dayton. He took a position as a director at WDSU-TV in New Orleans. By 1956, acting became his central focus, and he moved to the Los Angeles area.

Career 
Early in his career Nelson did stunt work for B-movie producer Roger Corman on the films Swamp Women (1956), Attack of the Crab Monsters (1957), Rock All Night (1957), Carnival Rock (1957), Night of the Blood Beast (1958), The Cry Baby Killer (1958), Teenage Cave Man (1958), and A Bucket of Blood (1959). In 1958, he acted in and produced actor-director Bruno VeSota's science-fiction/horror movie The Brain Eaters, with Roger Corman as the executive producer. The same year, he was cast as the lead in Devil's Partner, but the movie was not released until 1962. He also appeared in the 1960 thriller Valley of the Redwoods and the 1963 comedy drama Soldier in the Rain, starring Steve McQueen and Jackie Gleason.

Nelson's television career featured many guest-starring roles, such as the talented, arrogant Dr. Wade Parsons in the 1962 episode "Doctor on Horseback" of the western series The Tall Man.

Nelson was cast in episodes of such other westerns as Maverick, Wagon Train, Black Saddle, Have Gun – Will Travel, The Rebel (five times), Johnny Ringo, Gunsmoke, Rawhide, Tombstone Territory, Bat Masterson, Laramie, Bonanza, Stoney Burke, The Dakotas, The Rifleman and Redigo. He appeared on drama and adventure series too, such as Combat!, The Fugitive, The Twilight Zone, Flight, The Silent Service, The Untouchables, The Outer Limits, Harbor Command, Tightrope, Coronado 9, The Eleventh Hour, Thriller, and Channing. He guest-starred on Mission: Impossible and military sitcom/drama Hennesey.

He made two guest appearances on Perry Mason, both times as the defendant; in 1961, he played Ward Nichols in "The Case of the Left-Handed Liar," and in 1964, he played Dirk Blake, father of the title character, in "The Case of the Missing Button". He also portrayed an assistant district attorney a TV series Adam 12 in 1974.

Peyton Place and later roles
In 1964, Nelson secured his most famous role, portraying Dr. Michael Rossi on the drama Peyton Place, staying with the series during its entire run from 1964 to 1969. Nelson reprised his role in two TV movies: Murder in Peyton Place and Peyton Place: The Next Generation.

After Peyton Place, Nelson worked in many more productions of all varieties. He teamed with former Peyton Place co-star Percy Rodriguez in the television series The Silent Force, which ran for 15 episodes in 1970–1971. He guest-starred with David Janssen in The Fugitive in 1963, and appeared as a different character later in the series. Subsequently, Nelson had guest-starring roles on many of the popular dramas of the 1970s and 1980s, including Marcus Welby, M.D., Laramie, Cannon, O'Hara, U.S. Treasury, Night Gallery, Banacek, Alias Smith and Jones, Mod Squad, Mission: Impossible, The Streets of San Francisco, Kung Fu, The F.B.I. (in 3 different roles), Adam-12, Ironside, Police Woman,  Medical Center (3 roles), The Bionic Woman, Gibbsville, McMillan and Wife, Dallas, The Rockford Files (2 roles), Barnaby Jones (2 roles), Charlie's Angels, Lou Grant, Trapper John, M.D., Vega$ (2 roles), CHiPs, Quincy M.E., Matt Houston, The Fall Guy, Dynasty, Cagney & Lacey, MacGyver, Jake and the Fatman (2 roles), and Murder, She Wrote (5 roles). 

Nelson appeared in many television movies such as Along Came a Spider (1970), The Screaming Woman (1972), Runaway! (1973), Houston, We've Got a Problem (1974), The Missing Are Deadly (1975), Superdome (1978), Doctors' Private Lives (1978) and Crash (1978), and served as host on the morning talk show The Ed Nelson Show, which he hosted for three years. During the 1980s, Nelson took on the role of patriarchal Senator Mark Denning in the daytime serial Capitol. In late 1986, Nelson was upset to discover that the show's writers had turned his character into a traitor, and quit the show in disgust, last airing in early January 1987, two months before the show's cancellation.

He also continued appearing in theatrical films, such as Airport 1975 (1974), That's the Way of the World (1975), Acapulco Gold (1976), Midway (1976), For the Love of Benji (1977), Police Academy 3: Back in Training (1986), Brenda Starr (1989), The Boneyard (1991), Who Am I? (1998) and Runaway Jury (2003).

He spent several years playing U.S. President Harry S. Truman on stage, replacing James Whitmore for the National Tour of Give 'Em Hell, Harry.

Personal life
While living in Los Angeles, Nelson was an active member of the Screen Actors Guild and was elected to the union board for many years. Nelson was a long-standing member of the Academy of Motion Picture Arts and Sciences. In the early 1970s, he ran for city council and mayor of San Dimas, California until a Federal Communications Commission ruling stated that his political opponents must be given equal time if he appeared in television programs.

Later years 
In 1999, Nelson returned to Tulane University to finish credits toward his undergraduate degree, which he completed the following year at age 71. He and his wife, Patsy, enjoyed semi-retirement visiting their six children and 14 grandchildren. One of his children is actor Christopher S. Nelson.

Until 2005, he had been teaching acting and screenwriting in New Orleans at two local universities. Hurricane Katrina prompted him to move his family far to the north to Sterlington, Louisiana. At the time of his death, however, he had moved to Greensboro, North Carolina, where he had been in hospice care. He died at age 85.

Death 
Nelson died on August 9, 2014, in Greensboro, North Carolina from congestive heart failure. He was 85 years old.

Selected filmography

The Steel Trap (1952) as Man in Ticket Line at Airport
New Orleans Uncensored (1955) as Charlie
Swamp Women (1956) as Police Sergeant
Attack of the Crab Monsters (1957) as Ensign Quinlan
Rock All Night (1957) as Pete
Invasion of the Saucer Men (1957) as Tom
Bayou (1957) as Etienne 
Hell on Devil's Island (1957) as Guard No. 2
Teenage Doll (1957) as Police Officer 'Dutch' / Blind Man
Carnival Rock (1957) as Cannon
Highway Patrol (1957) as Monty in "Wounded"
Street of Darkness (1958) as Slavo
Teenage Caveman (1958) as Blond Tribe Member
She Gods of Shark Reef (1958) as Guard
Devil's Partner (filmed in 1958, released in 1961) as Nick Richards / Pete Jensen
Night of the Blood Beast (1958) as Dave Randall
The Cry Baby Killer (1958) as Rick Connor
Hot Car Girl (1958) as Second Cop at Soda Bar
The Brain Eaters (1958) as Dr. Paul Kettering
I Mobster (1959) as Sid - Henchman
The Young Captives (1959) as Norm Britt
T-Bird Gang (1959) as Alex Hendricks 
A Bucket of Blood (1959) as Art Lacroix
Valley of the Redwoods (1960) as Dino Michaelis
Code of Silence (1960) as Paul Lane
Elmer Gantry (1960) as Man on Phone at Sister Sharon Headquarters
The Rifleman (1960) as Stacey Beldon
The Rifleman (1960) as Ben Travis
The Rifleman (1961) as Ben Vargas 
Gunsmoke (1961) as Perce McCall
Bat Masterson (1961) as Outlaw Browder
Perry Mason (1961) as Ward Nichols
Judgment at Nuremberg (1961) as Captain at Nightclub Announcing Call-up of Officers
Death Valley Days (1962 episode "Fort Bowie:Urgent") as Frank Girard
Bonanza (TV series, 1962) Episode: "The Miracle Maker" as Garth
Soldier in the Rain (1963) as MP Sgt. James Priest
The Man from Galveston (1963) as Cole Marteen
Combat! (TV series, 1964) Episode: "The Eyes of the Hunter" as Burgess
Perry Mason (1964) as Dirk Blake
Along Came a Spider (1970) as Dr. Martin Becker
The Screaming Woman (1972) as Carl Nesbitt
Time to Run (1973) as Warren Cole
Airport 1975 (1974) as Major John Alexander
That's the Way of the World (1975) as Carlton James
Acapulco Gold (1976) as Ray Hollister
Midway (1976) as Admiral Harry Pearson
For the Love of Benji (1977) as Chandler Dietrich
Police Academy 3: Back in Training (1986) as Governor Neilson
Brenda Starr (1989) as President Harry S. Truman
Deadly Weapon (1989) as General Stone
The Boneyard (1991) as Jersey Callum
Cries of Silence (1996) as Dr. August Claiborne
Who Am I? (1998) as General Sherman
Tony Bravo in Scenes from a Forgotten Cinema (2000) as Ghost of Mary's Dad
Runaway Jury (2003) as George Dressler

’’Kodachrome’’ (2017) lead

Selected Television

References

External links

1928 births
2014 deaths
United States Navy sailors
American male soap opera actors
American male television actors
American male film actors
People from Greensboro, North Carolina
People from Monroe, Louisiana
Male actors from New Orleans
Tulane University alumni
People from San Dimas, California
Western (genre) television actors